Kallikrein-related peptidase 9 also known as KLK9 is an enzyme which in humans is encoded by the KLK9 gene.

Function 

KLK9 belongs to the kallikrein subgroup of serine proteases, which have diverse physiologic functions in many tissues. KLK9 is primarily expressed in thymus, testis, spinal cord, cerebellum, trachea, mammary gland, prostate, brain, salivary gland, ovary, and skin.

Clinical significance 

KLK9 is under steroid hormone regulation in ovarian and breast cancer cell lines and is a potential prognostic marker for early-stage ovarian and breast cancer patients.

References

Further reading

External links 
 The MEROPS online database for peptidases and their inhibitors: S01.307